908 Buda (prov. designation:  or ) is a background asteroid from the inner regions of the asteroid belt, approximately  in diameter. It was discovered by German astronomer Max Wolf at the Heidelberg Observatory on 30 November 1918. The uncommon L-type asteroid has a rotation period of 14.6 hours. It was named after Buda, the smaller part of the Hungarian city of Budapest.

Orbit and classification 

Buda is a non-family asteroid of the main belt's background population when applying the hierarchical clustering method to its proper orbital elements. It orbits the Sun in the inner asteroid belt at a distance of 2.1–2.8 AU once every 3 years and 11 months (1,421 days; semi-major axis of 2.47 AU). Its orbit has an eccentricity of 0.15 and an inclination of 13° with respect to the ecliptic. The body's observation arc begins at Heidelberg Observatory with its official discovery observation on 30 November 1918.

Naming 

This minor planet was named after Buda, the smaller part of the Hungarian capital city of Budapest (the larger part being Pest). It is located on the west bank of the Danube River. The asteroid's  citation was mentioned in The Names of the Minor Planets by Paul Herget in 1955.

Physical characteristics 

In the Bus–Binzel SMASS classification, Buda is an uncommon L-type, while in the Bus–DeMeo taxonomy, it is a D-type asteroid.

Rotation period and poles 

In March 2009, a rotational lightcurve of Buda was obtained from photometric observations by Brian Warner at his Palmer Divide Observatory  in Colorado. Analysis gave a classically shaped bimodal lightcurve with a rotation period of  hours and a brightness variation of  magnitude. This supersedes a period determination by French amateur astronomer Laurent Bernasconi from January 2005, who determined a period of  hours with an amplitude of  magnitude. Observations by Julian Oey in 2015 gave two similar periods.

Diameter and albedo 

The Collaborative Asteroid Lightcurve Link derives an albedo of 0.1509 and calculates a diameter of 24.33 kilometers based on an absolute magnitude of 10.74.

Notes

References

External links 
 Lightcurve Database Query (LCDB), at www.minorplanet.info
 Dictionary of Minor Planet Names, Google books
 Asteroids and comets rotation curves, CdR – Geneva Observatory, Raoul Behrend
 Discovery Circumstances: Numbered Minor Planets (1)-(5000) – Minor Planet Center
 
 

000908
Discoveries by Max Wolf
Named minor planets
000908
19181130